This is a list of the media references in La Corda d'Oro, the role-playing game series. The following are the media information for the dating simulation game, manga and anime series, and Kin'iro no Corda.

Games
The first game of the Kin'iro no Corda series was released on September 19, 2003, for PC platform. Later, it was then released for PlayStation 2 on March 18, 2004. After that, it was also released for PlayStation Portable on November 10, 2005.

On March 15, 2007, the second game was released, but only for PlayStation 2. A sequel to the second game Kin'iro no Corda 2: Encore was released for the same platform on September 20, 2007. The encore game added a new character, Mari Tsuzuki and made Akihiro Kira an obtainable character. Encore is like a side-game to the second game and is much shorter.
 
According to LaLa, the magazine where the manga is serializing has announced that a new game titled Kin’iro no Corda 2: Forte is set to be released for the PlayStation Portable platform. It will be released in 3 versions, a regular edition, a Premium box and the Treasure box in February 2009. There's also a new character in the game named Kiriya Etō.

According to the July issue of LaLa in 2009, another new game will be released in August, titled as Kin'iro no Corda 2 Forte: Encore. Mari Tsuzuki, the new character that appeared in Kin'iro no Corda: Encore will also appear in the new game which was voiced by Sayaka Ōhara. Kiriya Etō, the new character in Forte will also appear. The new game will also include a few new events such as staying together for a training camp as well as an after school date.

Media for the first game

Drama CDs
 - Catalogue number: KECH-1254
 - Catalogue number: KECH-1255
 - Catalogue number: KECH-1340
 - Catalogue number: KECH-1341

Vocal collections
espressivo - Catalogue number: KECH-1256
espressivo2 - Catalogue number: KECH-1342

Valentine CDs
fantasmagoria -  Catalogue number: KECH-1280
divertimento - Catalogue number: KECH-1355

Limited event CDs
Happy Time
intermezzo

Books
 -  
 -  
 -  
 -  
 -  
 -  
 -  
 -  

 -  
 -  
 -  
 -  
 -  
 -

Manga
 -  
 -  
 -  
 -

Novels
 -  
 -

Media for the second game

Drama CDs
 - Catalogue number: KECH-1419
 - Catalogue number: KECH-1420
 - Catalogue number: KECH-1446
 - Catalogue number: KECH-1450

Vocal collections
felice - Catalogue number: KECH-1421
felice2 - Catalogue number: KECH-1465

Background music and monologue compilation
vivace - Catalogue number: KECH-1418

Limited event CD
tutti

Books
 -  
 -  
 -  
 -  
 -  
 - 
 - 
 -

DVDs
primavera - Catalogue number: KEBH-1071
primavera2 - Catalogue number: KEBH-1087
primavera3 grand finale – Catalogue number: KEBH-1132

Manga
 -  
 -  
 -  
 -

Media for Kin'iro no Corda: Forte

Vocal collections
SWEET♪TWINKLE - Catalogue number: KECH-1478

Manga
A month after the release of the PC version of Kin’iro no Corda, the manga adaptation of the game had started to serialize in Hakusensha’s monthly shōjo manga magazine of LaLa in October 2003. Yuki Kure, the person who contributed the character designs for the game, authors the manga.

In year 2006, the series has won the Outstanding Debut Award in Hakusensha Athena Newcomers' Awards.

As of March 2011, there are currently 16 volumes of the manga and it's published under the Hakusensha's shōjo manga imprint, Hana to Yume Comics.

The manga has been licensed by Viz Media in the United States under the title, La Corda D’oro. The first volume was released on October 3, 2006. Chuang Yi has also licensed the manga for its English release in Singapore.

Note: The following is the ISBN and publication dates for the Japanese edition.

Volume 1 - March 5, 2004: 
Volume 2 - August 5, 2004: 
Volume 3 - February 4, 2004: 
Volume 4 - August 5, 2005: 
Volume 5 - January 5, 2006: 
Volume 6 - May 2, 2006: 
Volume 7 - October 5, 2006: 
Volume 8 - March 5, 2007:  
Volume 9 - October 5, 2007: 
Volume 10 - March 5, 2008:  
Volume 11 - September 5, 2008: 
Volume 12 - March 5, 2009: 
Volume 13 - August 5, 2009: 
Volume 14 - February 5, 2010: 
Volume 15 - October 5, 2010: 
Volume 16 - December 29, 2010: 
Volume 17 - July 2011: 

Source:

Anime
The anime adaptation from the manga series, titled as Kin'iro no Corda ~primo passo~ was first broadcast by TV Tokyo starting from October 2006 to March 2007. Kōjin Ochi directs the series, while Reiko Yoshida did the series composition.

The anime is produced by Ruby Party, a sub-division in Koei that produces dating-simulation games that are targeted towards the female audience.

The anime also premiered on Animax under the title, La Corda D'Oro ~primo passo~. It was aired across its respective networks worldwide, including Hong Kong and Taiwan, also translating and dubbing the series into English for its English language networks in Southeast Asia and South Asia, and other regions.

The last volume of the DVD has compiled the special episode together. Even so, it has yet to be broadcast in Japan. However, it was aired on Animax's Southeast Asia English networks.

The series was later collected into 9 DVD volumes.

Episodes

Other related DVDs

Music
La Corda d'Oro

Opening theme
Brand New Breeze - episode 1-24 and episode 26
Song: Kanon
Lyrics and composition: Kanon

Ending themes
Crescendo - episode 1-24 and episode 26
Song: Stella Quintet

Brand New Breeze - episode 25

First selection - Opening Up
Hino: Chopin - Tristesse
Hihara: Wagner - Under the Double Eagle March
 Shimizu: Boccherini - Cello Concerto No.9 in B Flat Major (G.482)
Yunoki: Grieg - Morning Mood
Fuyumi: Max Reger - Romance in G Major
Tsukimori: Wieniawski - Polonaise Brilliante No. 1 Op. 4

Second selection - Something to Believe In
Hino: Pachelbel - Kanon und Gigue in D-Dur (Canon in D)
Tsuchiura: Chopin - Fantaisie-Impromptu
Hihara: Mendelssohn - Auf Flügeln des Gesanges
Shimizu: Saint-Saëns - Le Cygne (The Swan)
Yunoki: Massenet - Thaïs Meditation
Tsukimori: Vitali - Chaconne
Fuyumi: Saint-Saëns - Romance

Third selection - Irreplaceable Parts
Hino: Tchaikovsky - Mélodie
Tsukimori: Ravel – Tzigane
Hihara: Schubert - Serenade
Shimizu: Fauré - Sicilienne
Yunoki: Bach - Partita in A Minor
Tsuchiura: Chopin - The Revolutionary Étude
Fuyumi: Schumann - Three Romances No. 2

Final selection - Setting Free
Hino: Schubert - Ave Maria
Tsukimori: Paganini - Caprice No. 24
Hihara: Holst - Jupiter from The Planets
Shimizu: Bach - Prelude from Suites for Solo Cello No.1
Yunoki: Rachmaninov - Vocalise
Tsuchiura: Liszt - La Campanella
Fuyumi: Polish Folk Song - Clarinet Polka
Concert ending special for Kahoko: Elgar - Salut d'Amour

Special episode - The Search For That Singular Sound
Hino: Elgar - Op. 12 Salut D'Amour (Accompanied by Fuyumi)
Tsukimori: Beethoven - Op. 50, Romance No.2 in F major
Hihara and Hino: Gossec - Gavotte in D Major
Shimizu: Bach - Suites for Solo Cello No.1, Prelude
Yunoki: Drigo - Notturno d' Amore "Serenade"
Tsuchiura: Liszt - Liebesträume No. 3 in A Flat Major

CDs

Books
 - 
 - 
 - 
 -

Manga
 - 
 -

Kin'iro no Corda ~secondo passo~
A special under the name Kin'iro no Corda ~secondo passo~ was first aired on March 26, 2009, by Kids Station. This special consists on two episodes, where the three new characters that appeared in the later games of the franchise are introduced.

While the production staffs for the series remained the same, there were three new additions to the voice cast that includes Satoshi Hino voicing Kiriya Etō, Yūya Uchida voicing Akihiko Kira and Mamoru Miyano voicing Aoi Kaji.

Theme song
蒼穹のスコア ～The score in blue～
Performance: stella quintet+
Lyrics: Akio Inoue

Music In Secondo Passo

Hino Kahoko - Sicilienne by Maria Theresa von Paradis

Ensemble - "Ruslan and Ludmilla" Overture composed by Glinka

Aoi Kaji - Traumerei (Dreaming) in F major from "Kinderszenen" (Scenes from Childhood) by Robert Schumann

CDs
Kin’iro no Corda ~secondo passo~ Classic Collection

Radio
Kin'iro no Corda ~The After School Etude~  is a radio show that is broadcast by Radio Osaka and TBS Radio in Japan.

The show's personalities are Kishō Taniyama as Len Tsukimori and Katsuyuki Konishi as Shinobu Osaki. In the show, they called themselves , a name made up of Katsuyuki Konishi's and Kishō Taniyama's last name.

After it finished airing at Radio Osaka and TBS Radio, Lantis Web Radio took it up and re-broadcast it as an Internet radio.

Events

Concert
Kanon, Reiko Takagi, Yūki Nakajima as well as the other voice cast and musicians who performed the pieces in the anime were present at the concert to perform.

The concert was recorded and was released as a DVD on October 17, 2007.

Stella Concert 2
A live concert titled  was held at Showa Women University's Hitomi Memorial Hall on February 22, 2009.

Unlike the previous concert, the voice casts are not present for the concert, but the performing cast is having light classical concert. The music from the second game will be performed as well.

References

See also
Yuki Kure
Kanon
Stella Quintet

La Corda d'Oro
La Corda dOro